Lystad is a surname. Notable people with the surname include:

Elsa Lystad (born 1930), Norwegian actress
Fredrik Lystad Jacobsen (born 1990),  Norwegian professional ice hockey player
Harald Lystad (1875–1950), Norwegian physician, ophthalmologist and president of the Norwegian Ophthalmological Society
Joakim Lystad (born 1953), Norwegian civil servant
Knut Lystad (born 1946), Norwegian actor, singer, translator, screenwriter, comedian and occasional director
Lars Lystad, Norwegian ski-orienteering competitor and world champion
Magne Lystad (1932–1999), Norwegian orienteering competitor

See also 
Lystad Bay, is a bay 2.5 nautical miles (5 km) wide which indents the west side of Horseshoe Island